Victor Oladokun (born Victor Bandele Oladokun) is a British-Nigerian journalist, broadcaster and  communications strategist. He was the Director of Communication and External Relations at the African Development Bank Group AFDB  and producer and host of the popular internationally acclaimed TV magazine programs CBN World News and Turning Point on the Christian Broadcasting Network CBN.

Early life
Oladokun was born in 1958 in London, England to an Irish mother from County Clare and a Nigerian father from Ondo town in Ondo state, Nigeria. He grew up in London and Liverpool. He has also lived in Nigeria and the United States.

Education
Oladokun attended Corinthian Avenue Primary School (now Corinthian Primary School) in Liverpool; a Canadian Jesuit run Catholic high school, St. Joseph's College in Ondo, Nigeria; and the University of Ife (now Obafemi Awolowo University), Nigeria, where he studied History and Political Science from 1977 to 1981. At Ife he developed a fascination with the media and envisioned a future television and media landscape that included improved professional presentations, innovative programs, and inspirational content.

Oladokun holds a Master of Arts in Communication from Regent University, Virginia Beach, Virginia, US and also a Doctorate of Strategic Leadership (DSL) degree from the same university.

Career
Early in his career, Oladokun worked at Cadbury Nigeria Plc in various management positions from 1983 to 1986 as Publications Manager, Media Relations Manager, and Acting Corporate Affairs Manager. From 1986 to 1987, he was the Group Public Relations Manager/Spokesperson for the A.G. Leventis Group of companies, Lagos, Nigeria.

Between 1990 and 2009, he worked in the United States as a news journalist, international TV host, producer, senior producer, and later as a managing producer at CBN International in Virginia Beach. At CBN, he developed and produced a portfolio of international TV programs including the popular CBN World News and Turning Point.

For almost two decades, along with his long-time co-host Kathy Edwards (née Rucker), they popularised several news and magazine programs, including CBN World News and Turning Point, across English-speaking Africa, the Caribbean and the UK.

Oladokun has interviewed global political, sports, literary, entertainment, and religious figures. They include Mohammed Ali, George Foreman, Thabo Mbeki, Olusegun Obasanjo, Ibrahim Babangida, Kenneth Kaunda, TD Jakes, Terry Waite (the Church of England envoy kidnapped and held hostage in Lebanon), Andraé Crouch, Myles Munroe, and Cece Winans. In a 1999 tell-all interview, then Nigerian President Olusegun Obasanjo spoke about corruption, debt reduction, his political ordeals including time spent in prison, forgiveness and his faith in God.

After 19 years at CBN, Oladokun worked as an international media and communication consultant between 2013 and 2017.

He is a former adjunct professor at Bethel College Hampton Virginia, United States.

Work with the African Development Bank Group
Oladokun was appointed Director of Communications and External Relations at the African Development Bank Group in 2017. Bank President Akinwumi Adesina credits him with restructuring the institution's communication team and strategically raising the profile of the bank, its operations and development impact. Oladokun retired from the Bank on 31 March 2020.

Oladokun is a media and communication strategist, public speaker, event moderator, TV host, and writer. He has spoken at various events including The Platform Nigeria, the African Economic Conference, and the Africa Investment Forum in South Africa. He moderated the 2019 Lagos State Governors Debate.

Personal life 
Oladokun is married to Georgina. They have two children and grandchildren.

Selected articles and publications
Future of Drone Technology — in Thisday 21 Mar. 2019
Africa: Saving Our Languages, Preserving Our Future
Mr President: 7 things you must do now
Echos of communism: The end of globalization?
COVID-19: Why Africa Urgently Needs an Ubuntu Plan
Locking down Africa now: There is no time for test runs
The End of Social Conventions?
Africa: Sports as a Business and a Brand

References

Nigerian journalists
1958 births
Living people
English people of Nigerian descent
Obafemi Awolowo University alumni
Regent University alumni
English people of Yoruba descent
Yoruba journalists
Journalists from London
Nigerian expatriates in the United States
Black British writers
British expatriates in the United States